The Grinnall Scorpion IV is a car made by Grinnall Specialist Cars. It is designed by Steve Harper to be essentially similar in appearance to the Scorpion III, but with an extra wheel and slightly larger dimensions. The Scorpion IV is an open sports car constructed from a fibreglass covered steel space frame chassis. Power is provided by an Audi 1.8 litre turbocharged petrol engine driving a 6 speed gearbox.

References

External links
Scorpion IV

Grinnall vehicles